Mario Roberto Beata Reyes (born October 17, 1974) is a retired Honduran soccer player.

Club career
Beata made his league debut for Marathón in 1992 against Súper Estrella and also played for Honduran sides Platense and Olimpia. He signed a contract with Hunan Billows in February 2010. He made his debut for Hunan against Shenyang Dongjin on 3 April and scored his first goal on 1 May.

He announced his retirement in March 2012. He played 426 matches in the national league, what made him the Honduran with most matches played in the league. He scored 5 goals in total, all of them for Marathón, and won 8 league titles.

International career
He made his debut for Honduras in a March 1996 friendly match against Colombia and has earned a total of 24 caps, scoring no goals. He has represented his country in 3 FIFA World Cup qualification matches and played at the 2007 UNCAF Nations Cup.

His final international was a June 2009 FIFA World Cup qualification match against the USA.

Personal life
Beata is married to Ángela Hernández with whom he has two children. He also has two children with his former wife.

Honours
Honduran League: 8
 2001 Clausura, 2002 Apertura, 2004 Clausura, 2005 Clausura, 2005 Apertura, 2007 Apertura, 2008 Apertura, 2009 Apertura

References

External links

1974 births
Living people
People from Puerto Cortés
Association football defenders
Honduran footballers
Honduras international footballers
C.D. Marathón players
Platense F.C. players
C.D. Olimpia players
Hunan Billows players
China League One players
Liga Nacional de Fútbol Profesional de Honduras players
Expatriate footballers in China
Honduran expatriates in China
2007 UNCAF Nations Cup players
2009 UNCAF Nations Cup players